Nyaru is a settlement in Kenya's Rift Valley Province. It is located in Elgeyo-Marakwet County's Keiyo South Constituency, precisely 45.6 km from Eldoret Town on the Eldoret-Eldama Ravine road. At the moment, Nyaru has the head offices of Keiyo South Constituency CDF (Constituency Development Fund).

References 

Populated places in Rift Valley Province